Adrián Ezequiel Cirigliano (born 24 January 1992) is an Argentine footballer, who plays as a midfielder.

Club career
Cirigliano made his first team debut for River Plate on April 11, 2010, in a 0–0 away draw with Atlético Tucumán. At 18, he started the game against Atlético alongside 36-year-old Matías Almeyda in midfield. A tough tackling midfielder who is useful on the ball, Cirigliano has been likened to a cross between Xavi and Javier Mascherano.

On July 18, 2013, Cirigliano joined the newly promoted Serie A club Hellas Verona on a loan deal.

On the first days of July, 2014, Cirigliano returns to River Plate coming back from his loan and attends practice. He refuses to travel to the pre-season in an attempt to negotiate a definitive transfer to Hellas Verona, which subsequently fails. Therefore, coach Marcelo Gallardo separates him from the rest of the squad.

On September 10, 2014, after being pardoned by the director, Cirigliano starts practice with River Plate's reserve team in order to re-join the squad and be able to play again.

On July 20, 2015, FC Dallas announced the deal has been reached to take the player on-loan from River Plate. Per league policy, terms were not revealed, though the club will be using their Target Allocation Money to help fund the loan-deal. He was released by Dallas in January 2016 and signed on loan by Club Atlético Tigre, resigning contract in May 2016.

On July 12, 2017, Cirigliano signed with Zacatepec.

International career
Cirigliano played for the Argentina national under-17 football team the 2009 South American Under-17 Football Championship and the 2009 FIFA U-17 World Cup, and with the Argentina national under-20 football team the 2011 South American Youth Championship. He has also been selected for the 2011 FIFA U-20 World Cup.

Honours
River Plate
Primera B Nacional: 2011–12
Copa Sudamericana: 2014

References

External links
 Ezequiel Cirigliano  Player Profile at Sabotage Times
 
 Argentine Primera statistics at Fútbol XXI  
 

1992 births
Living people
People from Tres de Febrero Partido
Argentine footballers
Argentine expatriate footballers
Argentina youth international footballers
Argentina under-20 international footballers
Argentine Primera División players
Association football midfielders
Pan American Games medalists in football
Pan American Games silver medalists for Argentina
Footballers at the 2011 Pan American Games
Medalists at the 2011 Pan American Games
Sportspeople from Buenos Aires Province
Serie A players
Serie D players
Major League Soccer players
Club Atlético River Plate footballers
Hellas Verona F.C. players
FC Dallas players
Godoy Cruz Antonio Tomba footballers
Club Atlético Zacatepec players
Atlético Tucumán footballers
Club Atlético Tigre footballers
San Luis de Quillota footballers
Primera B de Chile players
Argentine expatriate sportspeople in Chile
Argentine expatriate sportspeople in Italy
Argentine expatriate sportspeople in the United States
Expatriate footballers in Chile
Expatriate footballers in Italy
Expatriate soccer players in the United States